M. Saravanan is an Indian film director, best known for directing the film Engeyum Eppodhum (2011).

Career
Saravanan began his career as an assistant director under director A. R. Murugadoss. In 2009, he made his directorial debut with the Telugu film Ganesh starring Ram,. In 2011, he directed his first Tamil film Engeyum Eppodhum which featured Jai, Anjali, Ananya and Sharvanand, and was produced by his mentor A. R. Murugadoss in association with Fox Star Studios. The film gained very positive responses from critics and audience alike, emerging a sleeper hit. He was honoured with an award by the Human Rights Organization for directing Engeyum Eppodhum with a "very relevant social message which is the need of the hour".

Filmography

Awards

References

External links 
 

Tamil film directors
Living people
People from Namakkal district
Film directors from Tamil Nadu
Telugu film directors
Kannada film directors
21st-century Indian film directors
Screenwriters from Tamil Nadu
Tamil screenwriters
Telugu screenwriters
Kannada screenwriters
1977 births